Megachile albidula is a species of bee in the family Megachilidae. It was described by Johann Dietrich Alfken in 1931.

References

Albidula
Insects described in 1931